Euston Films is a British film and television production company. It was originally a subsidiary company of Thames Television, and operated from 1971 to 1994, producing various series for Thames, which were screened nationally on the ITV network. The most famous Euston Films productions include Van der Valk (1977), The Sweeney (1975–1978), Minder (1979–1994), Quatermass (1979), Danger UXB (1979), and Reilly, Ace of Spies (1983). The Sweeney had two feature film spin-offs, Sweeney! and Sweeney 2, which were also produced by Euston.

In 2014, Euston Films was revived as a production company by the owner of Thames, Fremantle.

History
The idea for Euston Films dated back to 1965, when writer Trevor Preston and directors Jim Goddard and Terry Green were working at ABC Television. They produced a detailed proposal for a specialist production unit that shot dramas on 16mm film, rather than standard videotape.

The company was founded in 1971 when three Thames executives, Lloyd Shirley, George Taylor and Brian Tesler realised there was a market for a new type of television drama. To facilitate this new-style of quick-changing action, Euston used two crews filming different scenes of the same programme at the same time, which ensured production times were quicker. Euston eschewed the studio videotape shooting more commonly used in British television drama at the time, and all material was filmed on location using the more expensive but higher-quality 16mm film stock.

Initial shows such as Special Branch gained reasonable praise, but it was The Sweeney that first gave the company critical and commercial success. Using a storyline style known as "kick, bollock and scramble", this formula continued in such shows as Fox and Widows. In 1979, the company created Minder as a vehicle for Sweeney star Dennis Waterman, giving the company its longest-running show. In September 1986, Euston Films announced it would increase its production of theatrical films in a joint venture with Film Four International.

With the demise of parent company Thames as an ITV broadcast franchise holder in 1992, Euston's output reduced. It continued to make Minder for ITV franchisee Central Independent Television, but when this series was axed in 1994, further work was not forthcoming.

Euston Films was based at Colet Court in Hammersmith, London.

List of Productions

Revival
In March 2014, it was announced that FremantleMedia (who had relaunched the Thames brand two years earlier) was to revive Euston Films as a production company. Former BBC drama executive Kate Harwood was recruited to take charge of the company. In December 2015, Euston announced it had secured a commission of a new drama series titled Hard Sun, written by Neil Cross, the creator of Luther. Filming took place in and around London, and the series was transmitted in early 2018. In July 2017, Channel 4 announced a new crime thriller called Baghdad Central would be produced by Euston Films.

Euston North/Castlefield
Euston Films launched a second production company called Euston North in January 2017. While the company carries on with their work in London and the South of England, the MediaCityUK-based Euston North focuses on productions in Manchester and the North of England. On 7 June 2019, Euston North was renamed Castlefield.

References

External links
Roddy Buxton Cinema for Television - TMC Behind the Screens.
Ian Jones This article terminates here: A journey through Euston Films - offthetelly.co.uk. March 2006.
John Williams Euston Films - BFI Screenonline.

Mass media companies established in 1971
Mass media companies disestablished in 1994
Television production companies of the United Kingdom
 
RTL Group